Vieux-Fort is a commune in the French overseas department of Guadeloupe. It is located on Basse-Terre Island.

Education
Public primary schools:
 Ecole primaire Auguste Feler

See also
Communes of the Guadeloupe department

References

Communes of Guadeloupe